The Cauris 2 Alliance (AC2) is a political alliance in Benin led by Léon Bani Bio Bigou and Étienne Kossi. The alliance supports President Yayi Boni.

History
In the April 2011 parliamentary elections the alliance finished in third place with 6.5% of the vote. However, it won just two seats, taken by Noudokpo Pascal Essou and Evariste Sinkpota.

References

Political party alliances in Benin